Seward is a city and county seat of Seward County, Nebraska, United States.  The population was 6,964 at the 2010 census. Seward is part of the Lincoln, Nebraska Metropolitan Statistical Area.  It is known for its large Fourth of July (Independence Day) celebration.

History
Seward was platted in 1868. It was named from Seward County. The railroad was built through Seward in 1873.

Geography
Seward is located at  (40.911216, -97.096972).

Demographics

2010 census
At the 2010 census there were 6,964 people, 2,521 households, and 1,653 families living in the city. The racial makeup of the city was 96.8% White, 0.6% African American, 0.4% Native American, 0.6% Asian, 0.3% from other races, and 1.4% from two or more races. Hispanic or Latino people of any race were 1.9%.

Of the 2,521 households 32.1% had children under the age of 18 living with them, 55.0% were married couples living together, 7.3% had a female householder with no husband present, 3.2% had a male householder with no wife present, and 34.4% were non-families. 30.2% of households were one person and 15.4% were one person aged 65 or older. The average household size was 2.39 and the average family size was 2.98.

The median age was 32.4 years. 22.6% of residents were under the age of 18; 18.8% were between the ages of 18 and 24; 21.5% were from 25 to 44; 22% were from 45 to 64; and 15.1% were 65 or older. The gender makeup of the city was 48.1% male and 51.9% female.

2000 census
At the 2000 census, there were 6,319 people, 2,281 households, and 1,494 families living in the city. The population density was 1,930.9 people per square mile (746.1/km). There were 2,415 housing units at an average density of 737.9 per square mile (285.1/km). The racial makeup of the city was 97.97% White, 0.46% African American, 0.13% Native American, 0.47% Asian, 0.36% from other races, and 0.60% from two or more races. Hispanic or Latino people of any race were 0.98% of the population.

Of the 2,281 households 31.7% had children under the age of 18 living with them, 55.6% were married couples living together, 7.3% had a female householder with no husband present, and 34.5% were non-families. 29.8% of households were one person and 16.2% were one person aged 65 or older. The average household size was 2.39 and the average family size was 2.99.

The age distribution was 22.6% under the age of 18, 20.1% from 18 to 24, 22.9% from 25 to 44, 17.9% from 45 to 64, and 16.5% 65 or older. The median age was 32 years. For every 100 females, there were 90.7 males. For every 100 females age 18 and over, there were 86.4 males.

The median household income was $41,264, and the median family income  was $54,808. Males had a median income of $33,828 versus $22,231 for females. The per capita income for the city was $17,668. About 4.1% of families and 6.6% of the population were below the poverty line, including 4.6% of those under age 18 and 5.3% of those age 65 or over.

Fourth of July City
Seward has celebrated US Independence Day on July 4 almost every year since 1868. Before the automobile came into general use, special trains were run to bring people to the event.  In 1973, Governor J. James Exon issued a proclamation designating Seward "Nebraska's Official 4th of July City." In 1976, the city was chosen to host Nebraska's July 4 celebrations for the United States Bicentennial. In 1979, a resolution in the US Congress named Seward "America's Official Fourth of July City—Small Town USA."   Recent attendance has been estimated at about 40,000.

Education
Seward Public Schools is the only public district in the city. It operates Seward Elementary School, Seward Middle School, and Seward High School. In addition, St. John Lutheran Elementary and Junior High School provide a LCMS Lutheran education and St. Vincent de Paul provides a Roman Catholic education.

Concordia University is located in Seward.

Sports
Seward was home to minor league baseball. From 1910 to 1913, the Seward Statesmen played as members of the Class D level Nebraska State League. In May 1913, Seward was struck by a deadly tornado and the franchise was relocated during the season to become the Beatrice Milkskimmers. The Seward Statesmen played home games at Fairgrounds Park.

Notable people
 Qveen Herby, rapper, singer, songwriter and entrepreneur, formerly of Karmin
 Seth Christian, filmmaker 
 Theodore C. Diers, Wyoming state representative and senator
 John Folda, bishop of the Roman Catholic Diocese of Fargo
 Joel D. Heck, Lutheran theologian
 Sam Koch, professional football player
 Mark Kolterman, Nebraska state legislator
 Reinhold Marxhausen, artist
 Quentin Neujahr, professional football player
 Thad Weber, baseball player
 Andrea von Kampen, musician
 Francis Vreeland, painter
 Bub Weller, professional football player

References

External links
 City of Seward

Cities in Nebraska
Cities in Seward County, Nebraska
County seats in Nebraska
Lincoln, Nebraska metropolitan area